Yaakov Yisrael Kanievsky, known as The Steipler or The Steipler Gaon (1899– 10 August 1985), 
was an ultra-Orthodox rabbi, Talmudic scholar, and posek 
("decisor" of Jewish law), and the author of Kehilos Yaakov, "a multi-volume Talmudic commentary".

Biography

Early years
The Steipler was born in Ukraine to Rabbi Chaim Peretz Kanievsky, a Chernobyl Chassid and the local shochet, and the latter's second wife Bracha. It was the family's subsequent move to the town of Hornostaypil, from which his appellation, "the Steipler", was later derived.

Around the age of 11, Kanievsky entered the Novardok Yeshiva in Navahrudak, studying under its famed rosh yeshiva, Rabbi Yosef Yoizel Horowitz. By age 19, having progressed rapidly and gained a reputation as a talmid chacham, he was recommended by Rabbi Horowitz "to head a yeshiva in Rogatshov" – as a branch of Horowitz's yeshiva.

Army service
The Bolshevik Revolution was in full swing, and Kanievsky was conscripted into the Tsarist army. In spite of the harsh conditions, he continued to strictly observe all the mitzvos.

Once, during his stint, Kanievsky was court-martialled for "failing to do his duty" when there was a possibility of breaking the Sabbath. He was forced to walk between two rows of soldiers who were ordered to beat him as he passed. In later years, Kanievsky remarked that the satisfaction he had enjoyed for making a stand for his religious convictions was an achievement never again equaled for the rest of his life; earlier, he had insisted on wearing a summer uniform in winter, since there was a problem of shatnez.

Later years
After serving under arms for some time, Kanievsky managed to get discharged. He decided to move to Białystok in Poland, in order to continue learning Torah unhindered from Communist interference. There, he studied under Rabbi Avraham Yoffen.

In 1922 (1925), Kanievsky published his first sefer ("book"), Sha'arei Tevunah ("gates of understanding"). This was received with great acclaim, and the work eventually reached Rabbi Avraham Yeshayahu Karelitz (known as the Chazon Ish) in Vilna. Without even meeting him, Rabbi Karelitz decided that the author of such a work was worthy of marrying his sister Miriam. Their father was Rabbi Shmaryahu Yosef Karelitz (1852 - 1916), the rabbi of Kosova (now Belarus) for thirty-four years, the father of the Karelitz family, which brought together prominent rabbis and Torah scholars.

Kanievsky was then appointed rosh yeshiva of the Novarodok yeshiva in Pinsk.

The Land of Israel
Rabbi Kanievsky is notable for having never left Israel for even a brief visit abroad since his arrival.

In 1934, at the urging of his brother-in-law, the Chazon Ish, he left Poland and moved to Israel, settling in Bnei Brak, where his brother-in-law, Rabbi Karelitz, had already been living for about eight months. Immediately upon his arrival, he was appointed Rosh Yeshiva of Yeshivas Beis Yosef - Novardok in Bnei brak (the first Yeshiva Gedolah in Bnei Brak, and one of the oldest yeshivas in the new settlement in the 20th century). For many years, he was head of two yeshivas there. Rabbi Kanievsky referred to the Chazon Ish as his "rabbi and mentor", who, in his final years, lived with the Kanievsky family, where Rebbetzin Miriam ran the communal household. Alongside Rabbi Elazar Shach, Rabbi Kanievsky was considered the spiritual leader of the Lithuanian ultra-Orthodox community. Though known as a world-class scholar, he shunned publicity, and lived in humble surroundings, teaching, writing, and devoting himself to Torah and good deeds. He was one of the presidents of Kollel Chazon Ish, and a member of the Asra Kadisha organization.

The Steipler was high-level hearing-impaired, and therefore, those who turned to him would write their question or request, and he would reply and bless them after reading the script. In his last decades, after the Beit Yosef Yeshiva was closed, he performed a yearly shiur at the Kollel Chazon Ish on the death anniversary of the Chazon Ish, with the participation of a large public.

He died on Friday night, 23rd of Menachem Av, 5745 (1985), with over 150,000 mourners attending his funeral. He was buried in the Shomrei Shabbos cemetery in Bnei Brak, near the tomb of the Chazon Ish. His son, Rabbi Chaim Kanievsky (1928-2022), following in his father's path, was a world-renowned Haredi rabbinical authority. He also has a daughter who currently lives in Bnei Brak.

Political involvement
The Steipler strongly criticized the Poalei Agudat Yisrael party, calling it "of the parties who damage in the vineyard of the House of the Lord", and added: "When we be granted the salvation, this party will be on the side of those who ruin and destroy religion." On the leaders of the party, he wrote that they "corrupted and turned it into a distinct-materialistic party ... and they put venom of "אשר קרך" into their ranks"; and on its voters, he wrote that they "violate the name of God in secret and in multitude".

In the 1984 elections, he joined Rabbi Shach's view, and announced: "My family and I will vote Shas." This was the beginning of the process that led to the split of Agudat Yisrael and the establishment of Degel HaTorah, prior to the 1989 elections.

Commemoration
The "Kehilot Yaakov Street" in the "Merkaz Baalei Melacha" neighborhood of Bnei Brak was named after him, after his demise, and the neighborhood was also renamed to "Kehilot Yaakov". The Lithuanian community in this neighborhood is called "Mishkenot Ya'akov", after him. In addition, the Yeshivat Kehilot Yaakov was established in his name, which was located in Hazon Yehezkel and moved to Modi'in Illit, as well as Yeshivat Tifereth Yisrael in the Givat Shaul neighborhood of Jerusalem. The name of the "Derech Emet" Talmud Torah in Petach Tikvah was changed to "Birchas Yaakov" after him, and the Talmud Torah network Tiferet Yaakov in Bnei Brak and Jerusalem is named after him.

Works

The Steipler wrote many works, his magnum opus being the multi-volume Kehillos Yaakov ("assembly of Jacob"), containing his unique analysis of most of the tractates and concepts of the Talmud; one volume he composed while in the army.

He also authored Birkas Peretz (on the Torah) and Chayei Olam. There are several volumes of letters, known as Karyana D'Igarta, and several volumes written by a disciple, Rabbi A Horowitz, that describe his daily life. These are known as Orchos Rabbeinu.

Rabbi Kanievsky's Eitsot V'Hadrachot contains "letters to an American psychologist, Dr. Yaakov Greenwald, in which The Steipler advises him on psychological problems".

Notes

References

External links
Biography: The Steipler
 OU Biography (currently unavailable)
 The Steipler Gaon, Zt'l 25th Av 5760, His Fifteenth Yahrtzeit 
 We Knew The Steipler Gaon, zt'l 23rd Av 5760, His Fifteenth Yahrtzeit

1899 births
1985 deaths
People from Kyiv Oblast
People from Radomyslsky Uyezd
20th-century Ukrainian rabbis
Jews from the Russian Empire
Ukrainian Haredi rabbis
Soviet Jews in the military
Soviet emigrants to Poland
Polish emigrants to Mandatory Palestine
Haredi rabbis in Mandatory Palestine
Haredi rabbis in Israel
Israeli people of Ukrainian-Jewish descent
Rabbis in Bnei Brak
20th-century Israeli rabbis
Rosh yeshivas
Novardok Yeshiva alumni